is a railway station on the Hakodate Main Line in Otaru, Hokkaido, Japan, operated by Hokkaido Railway Company (JR Hokkaido). The station is numbered "S11".

Lines
Zenibako Station is served by the Hakodate Main Line.

Station layout
The station consists of two ground-level opposed side platforms connected by a footbridge, serving two tracks. The station has automated ticket machines, automated turnstiles which accept Kitaca, and a "Midori no Madoguchi" staffed ticket office.

Platforms

Adjacent stations

Surrounding area
The Zenibako River enters to the Ishikari Bay 200 meters southwest of the station.

See also
 List of railway stations in Japan

References

Railway stations in Otaru
Railway stations in Japan opened in 1880